Francisco de Aguilar (1479 — 1571?), born Alonso de Aguilar, was a Spanish conquistador who took part in the expedition led by Hernán Cortés that resulted in the conquest of the Aztec Empire and the fall of Tenochtitlan, the capital of the Aztec state in the central Mexican plateau.

He was granted an encomienda after the conquest, but in 1529, eight years after the fall of Tenochtitlan, he gave up his encomienda and entered the Dominican Order, adopting the name Francisco. Aguilar spent the remaining 40 years of his life as a Dominican friar. According to Patricia de Fuente, who translated his account to English, Aguilar "was contemplative by nature, and ... he brooded about the moral aspect of the Conquest."

Late in his long life, in his early 80s, his fellow Dominicans urged him to write an account of the Aztec conquest drawing from his experiences. This account, known as Relación breve de la conquista de la Nueva España ("Brief Record [Account] of the Conquest of New Spain"), went unpublished in his lifetime, however a manuscript copy of it was preserved at the royal library of El Escorial outside of Madrid, Spain. It was first published in 1900 by the Mexican historian and archivist, Francisco del Paso y Troncoso. A modern English translation of Aguilar's chronicle is published in The Conquistadors: First-Person Accounts of the Conquest of Mexico,

In his elderly years, he was diagnosed with gout and he soon died in Mexico at the age of 92.

References

External links
 

Spanish conquistadors
Encomenderos
Spanish Dominicans
16th-century Mesoamericanists
Novohispanic Mesoamericanists
People of New Spain
1479 births
1571 deaths
Historians of Mesoamerica
16th-century Spanish writers
16th-century male writers
Colonial Mexico
Castilian-Manchegan conquistadors